Pavlova is a village in Svaliava Raion (district) of Zakarpattia Oblast (province) in western Ukraine. It had a population of 770, according to the 2001 census.

The village is located 17 miles from Mukachevo and 8 miles from Svaliava.

According to the Ukrainian Census, about 99% of the population speak the Ukrainian language as a native language, while 0.13% speak Russian and 0.13% speak Belorussian. Pavlovo had a Jewish community with a population of 71 in 1880. The Jewish community was eliminated during the Holocaust, primarily through forced labor battalions and deportation to Auschwitz concentration camp.

References

External links 
 History of the villages of Pavlovo and Rodnikova Huta 
 Solomonovo (Соломоновo) of Ukraine 1:100,000 topographic maps

Villages in Mukachevo Raion